The Basílica colegiata de Nuestra Señora de Guanajuato is considered one of the most emblematic structures in the City of Guanajuato, Mexico. It is located in the Plaza de la Paz, in front of the plaque that names the center of Guanajuato as a UNESCO World Heritage Site. It has had the distinction of basilica since 1957 and was built between 1671 and 1696.

Our Lady of Guanajuato

The interior of this notable Baroque-style building is characterized by: its main altar, gilded that protects a virgin who has become the patron saint and queen of the city: Our Lady of Guanajuato, anonymous Virgin of Andalusia.

This wooden sculpture was donated by King Charles V, Holy Roman Emperor and his son Philip II to the people of Guanajuato as a form of recognition for their mining prosperity on August 8, 1557. It represents the Virgin and Child, with a silver base embossed as base.

The image of Our Lady of Guanajuato is a 1.15m piece of polychrome and stewed cedar wood in which the Virgin Mary and the Child are seen. Initially, it had a rose in her right hand; which was replaced, upon arrival in Mexico, by a scepter. Likewise, a crown and a solid silver pedestal were added. To celebrate it, every August 8 a celebration is held in honor of its arrival. This statue was part of a recognition that the City of Guanajuato played an important role as one of the greatest royal mines in New Spain.

This basilica witnessed innumerable events; among them the baptism of Albino García, an insurgent guerrilla during the Mexican War of Independence, and the remains of Celedonio de Jarauta and Faustino Mártir, both granted by Antonio de Obregón y Alcocer, Count of La Valenciana.

Architecture

The Basílica colegiata de Nuestra Señora de Guanajuato was built between 1671 and 1696. With its Baroque and Neoclassical style on the outside, it has a main portal made up of three bodies; while in its internal part in the form of a Latin cross it has a nave, a dome, a crossing, two bell towers and a golden altar with the image of the Virgin of Our Lady of Guanajuato.

Interior view of the Collegiate Basilica of Our Lady of Guanajuato
Its construction and decoration was sponsored by miners from Guanajuato. In addition to the patron saint of the city, the church also has images of the Sacred Heart of Jesus, Saint Ignatius of Loyola and, in the upper part of the central altar, the statue of Santa Fe de Guanajuato. Its name and sculpture refer both to the statue of Santa Fe de Granada, place of origin of the image, and to the founding title of the noble and loyal city of Royal of Mines of Santa Fe de Guanajuato.

In its interior, a tubular organ stands out, with 1098 pipes, its brilliant tapestry and its great Neoclassical towers on the outside.

Patronage
During the century in which this work was built, the Criollo culture developed a need to stand out and a desire for greatness within the religious sphere that was also transferred to the personal feelings of those men. This religious sentiment called for piety and was expressed through pious works. Which were built thanks to the phenomenon of patronage. This phenomenon and its scope can be understood from the following quote:

The patrones understood this as an act to pay for their salvation, in addition to serving to satisfy their pride by perpetuating their name and distinguishing themselves socially. This basilica was not an exception to this phenomenon, since it was sponsored by the owners of the great mines of that time, for example the owner of the Valenciana Mine, Antonio de Obregón y Alcocer.

Gallery

See also
List of buildings in Guanajuato City

References

Guanajuato City
Roman Catholic churches completed in 1696
1671 establishments in New Spain
Baroque church buildings in Mexico